Cameron McGowan Currie (born October 3, 1948) is a senior United States district judge of the United States District Court for the District of South Carolina.

Education and career

Born in Florence, South Carolina, Currie received a Bachelor of Arts degree from the University of South Carolina in 1970 and a Juris Doctor from George Washington University Law School in 1975. She was a law clerk to United States Magistrate Arthur L. Burnett of the District of Columbia from 1973 to 1974. She was in private practice in Washington, D.C., from 1975 to 1978. She was an Assistant United States Attorney for the District of Columbia from 1978 to 1980, and for the District of South Carolina from 1980 to 1984.

Currie was a United States Magistrate for the District of South Carolina from 1984 to 1986, returning to private practice in Columbia, South Carolina from 1986 to 1989. She was also an Adjunct professor of law, University of South Carolina Law Center from 1986 to 1989. She was a Chief deputy state attorney general of Office of the State Attorney General, South Carolina from 1989 to 1994.

Federal judicial service

On January 27, 1994, Currie was nominated by President Bill Clinton to a seat on the United States District Court for the District of South Carolina vacated by Falcon Black Hawkins Jr. Currie was confirmed by the United States Senate on March 10, 1994, and received her commission on March 11, 1994. She took senior status on October 3, 2013.

References
  

1948 births
Living people
Assistant United States Attorneys
George Washington University Law School alumni
Judges of the United States District Court for the District of South Carolina
People from Florence, South Carolina
United States district court judges appointed by Bill Clinton
United States magistrate judges
University of South Carolina alumni
20th-century American judges
21st-century American judges
20th-century American women judges
21st-century American women judges